KOHA-LD, virtual and UHF digital channel 27, branded on-air as Telemundo Nebraska, is a low-powered Telemundo-affiliated television station licensed to Omaha, Nebraska, United States. The station is owned by Flood Communications, which is controlled by attorney and businessman Mike Flood. KOHA-LD's studios and transmitter are located on John Galt Boulevard in southwestern Omaha.

History
The station was formerly owned by Cornhusker Television and rebroadcast the Home Shopping Network on channel 65 before going dark in 2006. In 2007, the station returned to the air for a short period on channel 48, with an analog signal displaying a test pattern with the call sign and channel number. After a few months, the station again went dark.

In May 2009, the sale of the station to Word of God Fellowship, which runs the Daystar, was announced. The sale was completed on October 9, 2009.

A construction permit for digital broadcasting on channel 47 was allowed to expire on July 12, 2010. During this time, the analog signal also remained off the air. In September 2011, Word of God Fellowship filed a new application with the FCC to flash-cut to digital broadcasting on channel 48. This application was approved on October 6, 2011. KOHA-LP returned to the air, transmitting Daystar programming over an analog signal, in November 2011. On July 9, 2012, KOHA-LP began broadcasting a digital signal.

On August 2, 2012, the station changed its call sign to KOHA-LD. As of Spring 2018, the station is owned by Flood Communications and operates as a Telemundo affiliate as Telemundo Nebraska. It is the first Spanish language television affiliate in Omaha since former Azteca America affiliated KAZO-LP (2002-2007) and KXVO-DT2 (2008-2014).

KOHA-LD carries News Channel Nebraska on its second carrier and, as of August 4, 2018, Daystar on its third carrier.

On October 18, 2018, another channel 27, KFDY-LD, in Lincoln, became KOHA's sister station translator, and rebroadcasting began transmitting from its relocated tower at Southeast Lincoln of Yankee Hill Rd, and returns on air for the first time since October 20, 2017, the transmitter collapsed at N 27th & Superior St and strong wind conditions, leaving the station off the air in the Lincoln area.

Digital channels
The station's digital signal is multiplexed:

References

External links

Television stations in Omaha, Nebraska
Telemundo network affiliates
Daystar (TV network) affiliates
Television channels and stations established in 1992
Low-power television stations in the United States